Thathamme Poocha Poocha is a 1984 Indian Malayalam film, directed by Balu Kiriyath and produced by P. K. R. Pillai. The film stars Rajkumar, Suhasini, Lalu Alex and Unnimary in the lead roles. The film has musical score by M. B. Sreenivasan.

Cast
 
Rajkumar as Venugopal Menon
Suhasini as Kalyani
Lalu Alex as Chanthu
Unnimary as Shyama
Adoor Bhasi as Gonzalvous
Kuthiravattam Pappu as Ananthan
Kunchan as Kochappan
Mala Aravindan as Balaraman
Sukumari as Sumathy
Kundara Johnny
Jayamalini as Cabaret Dancer
Maniyanpilla Raju 
K. P. R. Pillai
Kuthiravattam Pappu 
Lalithasree 
P. K. Abraham

Soundtrack
The music was composed by M. B. Sreenivasan.

References

External links
  
 

1984 films
1980s Malayalam-language films